Crash bandicoot is an extinct bandicoot, known from fossils located at the Riversleigh World Heritage Area in northeast Australia.

Taxonomy 
The primary etymology is a reference to the eponymous character of the video game franchise Crash Bandicoot, and the gender of the genus name Crash is stated to be masculine.

The description for a new species of Riversleigh fauna was published in 2014, the authors proposing the specific epithet for the resemblance to the modern peramelid family of bandicoot and the generic term "crash" for the unexpected appearance of the taxon at a Riversleigh site from the Miocene epoch. The authors state this secondary allusion is to the species "crashing" out of a region of wet rainforest and radiating in the semiarid to arid habitat favoured by the modern species of bandicoots.

Description 

A genus known by a single species, Crash bandicoot is recognised as an early representative of a peramelid lineage that separated from the Chaeropodidae, a family represented by the modern pig-footed bandicoots Chaeropus, and Thylacomyidae family of the extant bilby genus Macrotis.
Prior to the discovery of the specimen, the earliest known fossil species of the family were Perameles bowensis and Perameles allinghamensis, both found in Pliocene deposits of Eastern states of Australia.

The body mass is estimated to have been around one kilogram. The holotype and only known specimen is a section of the animal's right maxillary with remaining evidence of intact molars M1–M3 and alveoli of the fourth molar.

Distribution and habitat 
The distribution of Crash bandicoot is restricted to Riversleigh, an area rich in series of well preserved fossil mammals. 
The only known location of specimens is the Alan's Ledge 1990 Site (AL90) at Riversleigh, at one time a cave. The dating of the site of deposition is middle Miocene, Riversleigh Faunal Zone C. approximately 15 mya, once a wet rainforest that  dominated the Riversleigh area.
The fauna discovered at the same site support the evidence of a local wet rainforest environment, and finding evidence of the still present bandicoot lineage at this early period implies that they first diversified in an area subject to an increasingly arid climate as the continent moved toward the equator.

References 

Riversleigh fauna
Peramelemorphs
Prehistoric marsupials
Fossil taxa described in 2014
Crash Bandicoot